Cecidipta is a genus of snout moths. It was described by Carlos Berg in 1877, and is known from Brazil.

Species
 Cecidipta cecidiptoides
 Cecidipta excoecariae Berg, 1877
 Cecidipta major (Amsel, 1956)
 Cecidipta teffealis (Schaus, 1922)

References

Epipaschiinae
Pyralidae genera